Michel Ciment (born 26 May 1938 in Paris) is a French film critic and the editor of the cinema magazine Positif.

Ciment is a Chevalier of the Order of Merit,  Chevalier of the Legion of Honour, Officer in the Order of Arts and Letters, and the former president of FIPRESCI.

Favorite films 

Ciment participated in the 2012 Sight & Sound critics' poll, where he listed his ten favorite films as follows: 2001: A Space Odyssey, The Earrings of Madame de..., Fellini's Casanova, Persona, Providence, The Rules of the Game, Salvatore Giuliano, Sansho the Bailiff, Sunrise: A Song of Two Humans, and Trouble in Paradise.

Publications 

 Kazan par Kazan (1973) 
 Le Dossier Rosi (1976) 
 Le Livre de Losey (1979) 
 Stanley Kubrick (1980)  
 Boorman : un visionnaire en son temps (1985) 
 Theo Angelopoulos (1989) 
 Le crime à l'écran : Une histoire de l'Amérique, coll. "Découvertes Gallimard" (n° 139), Paris: Gallimard (1992) 
 Passeport pour Hollywood : entretiens avec Wilder, Huston, Mankiewicz, Polanski, Forman & Wenders, (1992) 
 Fritz Lang : le meurtre et la loi, coll. "Découvertes Gallimard" (n° 442), Paris: Gallimard (2003) 
 Petite planète cinématographique (2003)

Film festival juror 
 26th Berlin International Film Festival, 1976
 1978 Cannes Film Festival
 1990 Locarno International Film Festival

Honours and distinctions 
 Chevalier de la Légion d'honneur
 Chevalier de l'Ordre national du Mérite
 Officier de l'Ordre des Arts et des Lettres
 Président de la FIPRESCI

References

External links 

 
 Interviews with Stanley Kubrick
 Interview (in French) about his function as Jury at the Cannes festival 1978
 Interview: Michel Ciment on "Mavericks and Outsiders: 'Positif' Celebrates American Cinema", Glenn Kenny, Notebook
 News brief: "The Michel Ciment Incident," Ali Naderzad, Screen Comment, 2017 Cannes Festival

1938 births
Living people
French film critics
French journalists
20th-century French writers
Chevaliers of the Légion d'honneur
Knights of the Ordre national du Mérite
Officiers of the Ordre des Arts et des Lettres
Writers from Paris
Radio France people
20th-century French male writers
French male non-fiction writers